Kunama is a rural locality in the South West Slopes of New South Wales, situated  west of Batlow at an altitude of approximately . The region is largely one of apple produce.

History
The area was established in the 1850s. The Kunama branch railway, also known as Batlow line, was completed in 1923 as an extension to the Tumut line, branching off at a junction close to Gilmore and was formally closed, in 1957.

Climate

Elevated by almost  and windward of the ranges, Kunama experiences a typical climate of the upper South West Slopes; with warm, stormy summers and cold, snowy winters. The extreme precipitation from winter to spring is brought about by westerly upwinds.

References

Snowy Valleys Council